Langford-Juan de Fuca is a provincial electoral district for the Legislative Assembly of British Columbia, Canada that was created in the 2015 redistribution from parts of Juan de Fuca. It was first contested in the 2017 election.

MLAs

Election results

References

External links 
Hi-Res Map (pdf)

British Columbia provincial electoral districts on Vancouver Island